The term information revolution describes current economic, social and technological trends beyond the Industrial Revolution.

Many competing terms have been proposed that focus on different aspects of this societal development.
The British polymath crystallographer J. D. Bernal  introduced the term "scientific and technical revolution" in his 1939 book The Social Function of Science to describe the new role that science and technology are coming to play within society. He asserted that science is becoming a "productive force", using the Marxist Theory of Productive Forces. After some controversy, the term was taken up by authors and institutions of the then-Soviet Bloc. Their aim was to show that socialism was a safe home for the scientific and technical ("technological" for some authors) revolution, referred to by the acronym STR. The book Civilization at the Crossroads, edited by the Czech philosopher Radovan Richta (1969), became a standard reference for this topic.

Daniel Bell (1980) challenged this theory and advocated post-industrial society, which would lead to a service economy rather than socialism. Many other authors presented their views, including Zbigniew Brzezinski (1976) with his "Technetronic Society".

Information in social and economic activities

The main feature of the information revolution is the growing economic, social and technological role of information. Information-related activities did not come up with the Information Revolution. They existed, in one form or the other, in all human societies, and eventually developed into institutions, such as the Platonic Academy, Aristotle's Peripatetic school in the Lyceum, the Musaeum and the Library of Alexandria, or the schools of Babylonian astronomy. The Agricultural Revolution and the Industrial Revolution came up when new informational inputs were produced by individual innovators, or by scientific and technical institutions. During the Information Revolution all these activities are experiencing continuous growth, while other information-oriented activities are emerging.

Information is the central theme of several new sciences, which emerged in the 1940s, including Shannon's (1949) Information Theory and Wiener's (1948) Cybernetics. Wiener stated: "information is information not matter or energy". This aphorism suggests that information should be considered along with matter and energy as the third constituent part of the Universe; information is carried by matter or by energy.  By the 1990s some writers believed that changes implied by the Information revolution will lead to not only a fiscal crisis for governments but also the disintegration of all "large structures".

The theory of information revolution
The term information revolution may relate to, or contrast with, such widely used terms as Industrial Revolution and Agricultural Revolution. Note, however, that you may prefer mentalist to materialist paradigm. The following fundamental aspects of the theory of information revolution can be given:

 The object of economic activities can be conceptualized according to the fundamental distinction between matter, energy, and information. These apply both to the object of each economic activity, as well as within each economic activity or enterprise. For instance, an industry may process matter (e.g. iron) using energy and information (production and process technologies, management, etc.).
 Information is a factor of production (along with capital, labor, land (economics)), as well as a product sold in the market, that is, a commodity. As such, it acquires use value and exchange value, and therefore a price.
 All products have use value, exchange value, and informational value. The latter can be measured by the information content of the product, in terms of innovation, design, etc.
 Industries develop information-generating activities, the so-called Research and Development (R&D) functions.
 Enterprises, and society at large, develop the information control and processing functions, in the form of management structures; these are also called "white-collar workers", "bureaucracy", "managerial functions", etc.
 Labor can be classified according to the object of labor, into information labor and non-information labor.
 Information activities constitute a large, new economic sector, the information sector along with the traditional primary sector, secondary sector, and tertiary sector, according to the three-sector hypothesis. These should be restated because they are based on the ambiguous definitions made by Colin Clark (1940), who included in the tertiary sector all activities that have not been included in the primary (agriculture, forestry, etc.) and secondary (manufacturing) sectors. The quaternary sector and the quinary sector of the economy attempt to classify these new activities, but their definitions are not based on a clear conceptual scheme, although the latter is considered by some as equivalent with the information sector. 
 From a strategic point of view, sectors can be defined as information sector, means of production, means of consumption, thus extending the classical Ricardo-Marx model of the Capitalist mode of production (see Influences on Karl Marx). Marx stressed in many occasions the role of the "intellectual element" in production, but failed to  find a place for it into his model.
 Innovations are the result of the production of new information, as new products, new methods of production, patents, etc. Diffusion of innovations manifests saturation effects (related term: market saturation), following certain cyclical patterns and creating "economic waves", also referred to as "business cycles". There are various types of waves, such as Kondratiev wave (54 years), Kuznets swing (18 years), Juglar cycle (9 years) and Kitchin (about 4 years, see also Joseph Schumpeter) distinguished by their nature, duration, and, thus, economic impact.
 Diffusion of innovations causes structural-sectoral shifts in the economy, which can be smooth or can create crisis and renewal, a process which Joseph Schumpeter called vividly "creative destruction".

From a different perspective, Irving E. Fang (1997) identified six 'Information Revolutions': writing, printing, mass media, entertainment, the 'tool shed' (which we call 'home' now), and the information highway. In this work the term 'information revolution' is used in a narrow sense, to describe trends in communication media.

Measuring and modeling the information revolution
Porat (1976) measured the information sector in the US using the input-output analysis; OECD has included statistics on the information sector in the economic reports of its member countries. Veneris (1984, 1990) explored the theoretical, economic and regional aspects of the informational revolution and developed a systems dynamics simulation computer model.

These works can be seen as following the path originated with the work of Fritz Machlup who in his (1962) book "The Production and Distribution of Knowledge in the United States", claimed that the "knowledge industry represented 29% of the US gross national product", which he saw as evidence that the Information Age had begun. He defines knowledge as a commodity and attempts to measure the magnitude of the production and distribution of this commodity within a modern economy. Machlup divided information use into three classes: instrumental, intellectual, and pastime knowledge. He identified also five types of knowledge: practical knowledge; intellectual knowledge, that is, general culture and the satisfying of intellectual curiosity; pastime knowledge, that is, knowledge satisfying non-intellectual curiosity or the desire for light entertainment and emotional stimulation; spiritual or religious knowledge; unwanted knowledge, accidentally acquired and aimlessly retained.

More recent estimates have reached the following results:
 the world's technological capacity to receive information through one-way broadcast networks grew at a sustained compound annual growth rate of 7% between 1986 and 2007;
 the world's technological capacity to store information grew at a sustained compound annual growth rate of 25% between 1986 and 2007;
 the world's effective capacity to exchange information through two-way telecommunication networks grew at a sustained compound annual growth rate of 30% during the same two decades;
 the world's technological capacity to compute information with the help of humanly guided general-purpose computers grew at a sustained compound annual growth rate of 61% during the same period.

See also

References

Bibliography 
 Mills, C. W. (1951),"White Collar: The American Middle Classes", Oxford University Press.
Grinin, L. (2007), Periodization of History: A theoretic-mathematical analysis. In: History & Mathematics. Moscow: KomKniga/URSS. P.10-38.

External links
Measuring the Information Economy: OECD reports
 OECD Guide for Measuring the Information Society
OECD "Measuring the Information Economy 2002"
Sectors of the Economy
The Information Revolution by Fractal-Vortex

 
Cybernetics
Postindustrial society
Postmodernism
Stages of history
Information economy